Dimitrios Thanopoulos (born 2 August 1959) is a Greek former wrestler who competed in the 1984 Summer Olympics. He was named the 1984 Greek Male Athlete of the Year.
He was born in Stemnitsa, Arkadia.

References

External links
 

1959 births
Living people
Olympic wrestlers of Greece
Wrestlers at the 1984 Summer Olympics
Greek male sport wrestlers
Olympic silver medalists for Greece
Olympic medalists in wrestling
Medalists at the 1984 Summer Olympics
Sportspeople from Athens
Sportspeople from the Peloponnese
People from Arcadia, Peloponnese
20th-century Greek people